Darren Lill (born 20 August 1982) is a South African professional racing cyclist. In 2011 he won the South African National Road Race Championships.

Personal life
He is married to fellow South African cyclist Candice Lill.

Major results

2006
 African Road Championships
1st  Road race 
5th Time trial
 2nd Road race, National Road Championships
4th Overall Giro del Capo
1st Mountains classification
2008
5th Tour de Leelanau
2009
6th Overall Tour de Beauce
2010
5th Overall Tour of Utah
7th Overall Tour of the Gila
1st Stage 5
2011
 National Road Championships
1st  Road race
3rd Time trial
All-Africa Games
2nd  Time trial
4th Road race
9th Overall Tour of South Africa
1st Stage 6
2012
1st  Overall Tour of Rwanda
1st Stages 3 & 7
1st  Mountains classification Volta ao Alentejo
2014
4th Road race, National Road Championships

References

External links
 

1982 births
Living people
South African male cyclists
People from Makhanda, Eastern Cape
African Games silver medalists for South Africa
African Games medalists in cycling
Competitors at the 2011 All-Africa Games
White South African people
Sportspeople from the Eastern Cape
20th-century South African people
21st-century South African people